The Philadelphia Reading Olympics is a city-wide jeopardy-style reading competition in Philadelphia in the United States. Organized by educational organization Philadelphia Reads, the aim of the program is to promote reading for pleasure among students, and encourage teamwork. In the 2012 Reading Olympics, 1,800 students from grades 4 - 8 participated, in 167 teams. The partners of the Reading Olympics are the Free Library of Philadelphia, the School District of Philadelphia, and the City of Philadelphia. Funding comes from corporate and foundation grants, and the event is staffed by around 200 community and corporate volunteers.

The Reading Olympics is a reading competition open to fourth through eighth graders from Philadelphia's public, parochial, charter, independent and after-school programs. Teams of up to 12 students collectively read the books on the Reading Olympics book list and work together as a team to answer questions about the books.

The teams meet in May at a college campus location to answer questions about the books. The teams accumulate points for every correct answer during three rounds of competition, earning each team member a blue, red, or green ribbon based on the number of points their team has earned. Corporate and community volunteers act as moderators and scorekeepers.

References

Education in Philadelphia